William Leo Higi (born August 29, 1933) is an American prelate of the Roman Catholic Church. He served as bishop of the Diocese of Lafayette in Indiana from 1984 to 2010.

Biography

Early years 
William Higi was born in Anderson, Indiana, on August 29, 1933.  While a high school junior, he became a seminarian for the Diocese of Indianapolis.

On May 30, 1959, Higi was ordained into the priesthood by Cardinal John Joseph Carberry for the Diocese of Lafayette at the Cathedral of St. Mary of the Immaculate Conception in Lafayette, Indiana.  He was appointed secretary to Bishop Carberry on August 13, 1962, vice-chancellor of the diocese on January 14, 1965, and chancellor on June 16, 1967. Pope Paul VI named Higi a prelate of honor on November 16, 1976.Appointed vicar general of the diocese on June 29, 1979, Higi was appointed as diocesan administrator on January 26, 1984, upon the death of Bishop George A. Fulcher.

Bishop of Lafayette in Indiana 
On April 7, 1984, Pope John Paul II appointed Higi as bishop of the Diocese of Lafayette in Indiana.  He was consecrated by Archbishop Edward O’Meara on June 6, 1984. During Higi's tenure, he dedicated several new churches and opened St. Theodore Guerin High School in Noblesville, Indiana. Higi also did outreach to Haiti on several trips there. 

On December 31, 2003, Higi reported that 18 priests serving in the diocese since 1950 had been accused by 26 parishioners of sexually abusing them as minors.  Nine priests were removed from ministry due to credible accusations.

Retirement 
On May 12  2010, Pope Benedict XVI accepted Higi's letter of resignation as bishop of the Diocese of Lafayette, required when a bishop reaches age 75.  The pope replaced him with Monseigneur Timothy Doherty.

Information from A History of the Diocese of Lafayette-in-Indiana by Rev. Anthony Prosen

See also
 

 Catholic Church hierarchy
 Catholic Church in the United States
 Historical list of the Catholic bishops of the United States
 List of Catholic bishops of the United States
 Lists of patriarchs, archbishops, and bishops

References

External links
Roman Catholic Diocese of Lafayette, Indiana Official website

Episcopal succession

1933 births
Living people
People from Anderson, Indiana
20th-century Roman Catholic bishops in the United States
21st-century Roman Catholic bishops in the United States
Roman Catholic bishops of Lafayette in Indiana